A Game without Rules (Czech: Hra bez pravidel) is a 1967 Czechoslovak action crime film directed by Jindřich Polák. The movie is about a policeman Málek who kills a robber in self-defense and leaves police to investigate on his own.

Plot
Shop manager Kubát and his assistant Litera are injured in a robbery. Policeman Málek investigates the robbery. He believes that Litera is involved in the robbery. Two robbers crash their car and one of them dies. The other one is shot by Málek who tracks him down. Málek is unable to find jewellery or to prove Litera's involvement and quits police. He becomes a taxi driver but keeps investigating the case.

Cast
 Svatopluk Matyáš as Málek
 Jiří Adamíra as Litera
 Zdeněk Kryzánek as Burian
 Karla Chadimová as Alena
 Vladimír Menšík as Pepi
 Josef Bláha as Klement
 František Šťastný as Franta
 Jan Tříska as Duda

References

External links
 

1967 films
1960s action drama films
Czechoslovak drama films
1960s Czech-language films
Czech action drama films
Czech crime drama films
Film noir
1967 crime drama films
1960s Czech films
Czech neo-noir films